Ciutat Vella (meaning in English "Old City")  is a district of Barcelona, numbered District 1. The name means "old city" in Catalan and refers to the oldest neighborhoods in the city of Barcelona, Catalonia, Spain. Ciutat Vella is nestled between the Mediterranean Sea and the neighborhood called l'Eixample ("the Extension"). 

There are four administrative neighborhoods (some of them include former or traditional neighborhoods):
La Barceloneta
El Gòtic
El Raval
Sant Pere, Santa Caterina i la Ribera:
Sant Pere
Santa Caterina
La Ribera

Les Rambles

Running down the center of the Ciutat Vella (dividing the Raval and Barri Gòtic) are the boulevards Les Rambles, popularly known as La Rambla (in singular) since they are continuous, like a single street. Les Rambles stretches from Plaça Catalunya to the Mediterranean Sea and, since the 1990s, now extends out over the sea into one of Barcelona's newest centers of entertainment, Maremàgnum. Each of Les Rambles has its own specialty.  La Rambla de les Flors (The Flowers Rambla) is devoted to flower stands, another Rambla to animal vendors (selling mainly birds), and the lowest Rambla hosts temporary art fairs. El Mercat de Sant Josep (more commonly known as La Boqueria) and Gran Teatre del Liceu (Barcelona's Opera House) are both located here. Les Rambles are among the most frequently travelled streets by pedestrians in Barcelona.

At the bottom, there is the Museu Marítim (naval museum), which chronicles the history of life on the Mediterranean, including a full-scale model of a galley. The museum is housed in the medieval Drassanes (shipyards), where the ships that made Catalonia a great sea power in the Mediterranean were built.

Raval

This portion of the city is often referred to as el Barri Xinès, or Chinatown. The Museu d'Art Contemporani de Barcelona (Contemporary Art Museum of Barcelona), the Rambla del Raval (a walkway to the sea) and the Filmoteca de Catalunya are in this neighborhood.

Barri Gòtic

This neighborhood houses the Cathedral of Barcelona, the Palau de la Generalitat de Catalunya, and l'Ajuntament de Barcelona (Barcelona city hall). Tourists visit this neighborhood to see  (a Spanish-style plaza) and to shop in one of the tourist shops along . The Museu Picasso can be found in the area known as el Born, within the Barri Gótic, in addition to the historic restaurant Els Quatre Gats (The Four Cats), which was a popular hang-out for artists, including Pablo Picasso.

To the north of the Gothic Quarter lie the Jardins de Fonseré i Mestre which contain modernist buildings housing zoological and geological collections.

La Ribera and El Born

La Barceloneta

See also
Districts of Barcelona

 Street names in Barcelona
 Urban planning of Barcelona

External links

Official website of the district of Ciutat Vella, from Bcn.cat
Foment Ciutat Vella
Information at Barceloca.com
Barcelona
Barri Gòtic and Raval map
La Ribera and Barceloneta map
Barri Gotic info from tourist-barcelona.com

 
Districts of Barcelona
History of Barcelona